North Carolina Highway 214 (NC 214) is a primary state highway in the U.S. state of North Carolina; it is entirely in Columbus County.

Route description
The intersection is located just south of exit 244 on US 74/US 76. The two-lane road heads southeast then due east through a rural area until reaching the communities of Hallsboro and Artesia. NC 214 heads north of Lake Waccamaw.

History
In the 1930s, NC 214 was made as a highway through Lake Waccamaw off of US 74 and NC 20. In the 1980s, it was rerouted so that NC 20 was now NC 214, and US 74 was on another highway. However, it was shorter than it is now; it was later extended to the east and west. The original NC 214 is now Lake Shore Drive.

Junction list

References

External links

NCRoads.com: N.C. 214

214
Transportation in Columbus County, North Carolina